The 2009 Wafu Club Championship is an association football competition that is contested between club sides in the WAFU/UFOA region.

It is sometimes referred to as the Eyadema Unity Cup.

Participants

Zone A

 Sunshine Stars F.C.
 Liberty Professionals
 ASFA Yennega
 USS Kraké
 Gombe United F.C.
 Akokana F.C.
 USC Bassam
 Tonnerre d'Abomey FC

Zone B

 ASC Stade
 Horoya AC
 AS Bakaridjan de Baroueli
 ASC HLM Dakar
 Sahel SC

Matches

First round

Group A

 
 
 
 
|}

Group B

 
 
 
|}

Second round
First leg were played August 21 to August 28 . Second leg were played September 17 to 19.

 
 
 
|}

Third round

 
|}

Fourth round/Repechage

 
|}
ASC HLM advances on penalties 4-2

Semifinals

Final

References

2009
2009 in African football